Beverly Vergel is an actress and film writer, director and producer, who now lives and works in Canada after many screen appearances in the Philippines during the 1980s and 1990s.

Biography
She was born in Manila, Philippines to actors César Ramirez and Alicia Vergel. She is younger sister to actor Ace Vergel. Her daughter Tracy Vergel was a former actress.

In 1988, she starred opposite Dolphy in Bakit kinagat ni Adan ang Mansanas ni Eba. From 1993 to 1997, she played the role of Almira del Valle, the biological mother of the protagonist Mara, in the television series Mara Clara. She later worked at TV channel GMA-7 as a scriptwriter and director, and at ABS-CBN as an executive producer and managing director. She directed her first film, Living Instead, in 2016, and won awards at independent film festivals in Canada, Spain and the US.

Filmography
Ang Anino ni Asedillo (1988)
Alega Gang: Public Enemy No.1 of Cebu (1988)
Ambush (1988)
Jockey Tyan (1988)
Smith & Wesson (1988)
Bakit Kinagat ni Adan ang Mansanas ni Eba? (1988)
Kahit Ako'y Tupang Itim, May Langit Rin (1988)
Handa Na ang Hukay Mo, Calida (1989)
Baril Ko ang Uusig (1990)
Sgt. Patalinghug: CIS Special Operations Group (1990)
Kolehiyala (1990)
Bala at Rosaryo (1990)
Lover's Delight (1990)
Gobernador (1992)
Moises Arcanghel: Sa Guhit ng Bala (1996)
Melencio Magat: Dugo Laban Dugo (1996)
Mara Clara: The Movie (1996)
Living Instead (as writer and director, 2016)
W'at Abowt Us (as director, 2019)

Awards
2016 – Barcelona Planet Film Festival: Best Woman Filmmaker for Living Instead 
2016 – Canadian Diversity Film Festival: Best director for Living Instead 
2016 – Los Angeles Film Awards: Honorable Mention: First Time Director for Living Instead

References

External links

Beverly Vergel Official Website

Living people
Filipino film actresses
Filipino film directors
Canadian actresses of Filipino descent
1964 births